Jesus of Nazareth ( AD 30 or 33) was a Jewish preacher and religious leader who most Christians believe to be the incarnation of God and Muslims believe to have been a prophet.

Jesus of Nazareth may also refer to:
 Jesus of Nazareth (TV series), 1977 British-Italian television miniseries
 Jesus of Nazareth: From the Baptism in the Jordan to the Transfiguration, 2007 book by Pope Benedict XVI
 Jesus of Nazareth: Holy Week, 2011 book by Pope Benedict XVI
 Jesus of Nazareth: The Infancy Narratives, 2012 book by Pope Benedict XVI

See also
 Jesus (disambiguation)
 Jesus Christ (disambiguation)